The medieval Latin term draconcopedes refers to a beast mentioned in some medieval zoologies.

Vincent of Beauvais describes this beast as a vast serpentine creature with the head, face and breasts of a woman.  In the Speculum naturale, he states:  ("Draconcopedes are great and powerful serpents, with maidenly faces like those of humans, ending in the body of a dragon").

Albertus Magnus states in his On Animals:
The draconcopedes are what the Greeks call a large serpent of the third class and of the dragon genus which, they say, has the maidenly face of an unbearded man.

Charles Dickens, in his Household Words, Volume 12, 1855, cites Bede in describing the draconcopedes as "the serpent with a women's head which tempted Eve."

References

Notes

Medieval European legendary creatures
Legendary serpents
Dragons
Human-headed mythical creatures
Female legendary creatures